Linda Hartley-Clark (born 28 December 1967) is an Australian actress who played Kerry Bishop on the Australian soap opera Neighbours from 1989 to 1990. She also did a guest stint in 2005 playing Gabrielle Walker, who in the storyline was recognised by Harold Bishop (Ian Smith) as Kerry's lookalike. Linda also played a small character in the first year of Neighbours called Gloria Slater, who was a friend/colleague of Paul Robinson. In 2004 and 2006, Hartley-Clark provided voiceovers for Kerry's diary being read by her daughter Sky Mangel (Stephanie McIntosh). 

Before this she appeared in children's drama series Home, and in Prisoner as Roach Waters in 1986. Hartley-Clark lives in Melbourne with her husband, John Clark (married since 1989, (former drummer with Craig McLachlan's band, Check 1–2) and their two young children, where she works as a relationship counsellor, having qualified with a PhD from Deakin University.

Filmography

References

External links
 

1967 births
Living people
Australian film actresses
Australian soap opera actresses
20th-century Australian actresses
21st-century Australian actresses